Gustavus Adolphus Day is celebrated in Sweden, Finland, and Estonia on 6 November in memory of King Gustavus Adolphus of Sweden. Observing the day became popular after the 200th anniversary of the king's death in 1632. It is a general flag flying day in Sweden and Finland. Today it is mainly connected with the consumption of Gustavus Adolphus pastries.

Date 
According to the Gregorian calendar, the king died on 16 November, but the Julian calendar ("old style") was still used in Protestant Sweden at the time and that date – 6 November – is still used.

History 
Gustavus Adolphus Day is celebrated in Sweden, Finland, and Estonia on 6 November in memory of King Gustavus Adolphus of Sweden, who was killed on that date (old style) in 1632 at the Battle of Lützen in the Thirty Years' War. The day is named for the king and is a general flag flying day in Sweden and in Finland.

The day has been celebrated since the early 19th century and became especially popular after the 200th anniversary celebration in 1832, of the king's death. The day was formerly celebrated with torchlight processions and patriotic speeches. Today what remains is mainly the consumption of the Gustavus Adolphus pastry (Gustav Adolfsbakelse in Swedish) on this day, with a chocolate or marzipan relief of that king on top.  In Sweden, the day is especially observed in Gothenburg, which was founded by the king, but also in cities with old educational traditions, such as Uppsala, where he donated considerable funding to the university, and in cities where the military traditionally has been based.

The day has been celebrated in Finland since 1908 by the Swedish speakers as Svenska dagen, Finnish Swedish Heritage Day. In Estonia, which like Finland was a part of Sweden during the reign of Gustavus Adolphus, the day is known as Gustav Adolfi päev. In all three countries, 6 November is the name day for Gustav Adolf, Gustavus Adolphus' name in Swedish, or Kustaa Aadolf, the name in Finnish.

Sjättenovembervägen ("Sixth November Road"), a part of the old Göta highway in the Stockholm borough of Älvsjö, is named for this day. According to the 1924 street naming committee, the road was the entry point into Stockholm for the king's funeral procession.

References 
 External links 
 In Memory of a Great Man, Spokane Daily Chronicle, 4 November 1901 Swedes in the US celebrating Gustavus Adolphus Day, 1909

Gustavus Adolphus of Sweden
November observances
Swedish culture
Society of Sweden
Lutheranism in Sweden
Finnish flag flying days
Swedish flag flying days
Autumn events in Sweden